John Bernard Bamborough (3 January 1921 – 13 February 2009) was a British scholar of English literature and founding Principal of Linacre College, Oxford.

Bamborough was educated at The Haberdashers' Aske's Boys' School in Elstree, Hertfordshire and at New College, Oxford. After serving five years in the Royal Navy during World War II he returned to Oxford as a Fellow of first New College and then Wadham College, where between 1947 and 1961 he was in succession Dean, Domestic Bursar and Senior Tutor.

Bamborough left Wadham to embark on an ambitious project that was to change the shape of the University. As recounted by a former student:

The outcome was Linacre College (initially Linacre House), the first Oxford University college to accept only graduate students and the first to admit men and women on an equal basis. Bamborough had the central role in establishing and nurturing the new institution and he remained its Principal until 1988, also serving within the university administration as a member of the Hebdomadal Council from 1961 to 1979 and as Chairman of the General Board of the Faculties from 1964 to 1967. He is fondly remembered by many students and staff, one of whom wrote in a book dedicated to the Principal,

After retiring as Principal, Bamborough focused on scholarship. Since 1979 he had been working on the world's first full commentary on Robert Burton's The Anatomy of Melancholy, an enormous 17th Century book with hundreds of obscure sources. The final volume of  Bamborough's work was published in 2000, nine years before his death. An accommodation building on the main Linacre College site is named in his honour.

Publications
Books
 The Little World of Man (London: Longmans 1952)
 Ben Jonson (London: Longmans 1959)
 Robert Burton: The Anatomy of Melancholy (Oxford: Clarendon Press, six volumes 1989-2000)

References

External link

Fellows of Linacre College, Oxford
Fellows of New College, Oxford
Fellows of Wadham College, Oxford
Recipients of the Order of Merit of the Italian Republic
Pro-Vice-Chancellors of the University of Oxford
People educated at Haberdashers' Boys' School
1921 births
2009 deaths
Principals of Linacre College, Oxford